Frederick Busch (August 1, 1941 – February 23, 2006) was an American writer, and the author of nearly 30 books including volumes of short stories and novels.

Early life
Frederick Matthew Busch was born in Brooklyn, New York on August 01, 1941. He graduated from Muhlenberg College in 1962, and earned a master's degree from Columbia in 1967. Busch and his wife lived briefly in Greenwich Village, where they scraped by until Busch got a job teaching at Colgate University in 1966.

Teaching career
Busch was professor  of literature at Colgate University in Hamilton, New York from 1966 to 2003. He also served as acting director of the University of Iowa Writers’ Workshop in 1978-79.

Writing career
Busch had more than 30 books published in his lifetime. He won numerous awards, including the Harry and Ethel Daroff Award in 1985 for Invisible Mending; the American Academy of Arts and Letters Fiction Award in 1986; and the PEN/Malamud Award in 1991.

Personal life
Busch met his future wife Judith Burroughs in Allentown, PA while attending Muhlenberg College in 1962. They married in 1963. 

Busch and his wife had two sons, Benjamin and Nicholas. Benjamin Busch is an acclaimed actor. Nicholas Busch was also a graduate of Muhlenberg College in 1995.

Busch died of a heart attack in Manhattan, New York City, aged 64.

Honours and awards 
 1962 Fellowship Woodrow Wilson Foundation
 1981 Fellowship Guggenheim Foundation
 1981 Fellowship Ingram Merrill Foundation
 1985 National Jewish Book Award for Fiction, Jewish Book Council
 1986 American Academy of Arts and Letters Fiction Award
 1991 PEN/Malamud Award for Excellence in Short Fiction
 1997 New York Times Notable Book for "Girls: A Novel"
 1999 National Book Critics Circle Award Nomination for The Night Inspector
 2000 PEN/Faulkner Award for Fiction finalist, for "The Night Inspector

Bibliography

Novels  
 I Wanted A Year Without Fall - a novel, London: Calder & Boyars, 1971
 Manual Labor - a novel, New York: New Directions, 1974
 Domestic Particulars: a Family Chronicle, New Directions, 1976
 Mutual Friend, New York: Harper & Row, 1978
 Rounds, New York: Farrar, Straus and Giroux, 1980
 Take This Man, Farrar, Straus and Giroux (1981)
 Invisible Mending: a novel, David R. Godine, 1984
 Sometimes I Live in the Country, David R. Godine 1986
 War Babies, New Directions, 1989
 Harry and Catherine, Knopf, 1990
 Closing Arguments, Ticknor & Fields, 1991
 Long Way From Home, Ticknor & Fields, 1993
 Girls: A Novel, Harmony Books, 1997
 The Night Inspector, Harmony Books (1999)
 A Memory of War, W. W. Norton & Co (2003)
 North: A Novel, W. W. Norton & Co (2005) (sequel to Girls)

Short story collections 
 Hardwater Country - stories, New York: Knopf (1979)
 Too Late American Boyhood Blues: ten stories, David R. Godine (1984)
 Absent Friends, NY: Knopf (1989)
 Children in the Woods: New and Selected Stories, Ticknor & Fields (1994)
 Don't Tell Anyone: Short Stories and a Novella, W. W. Norton & Co (2000)
 Rescue Missions, W. W. Norton & Co (2006)
 The Stories of Frederick Busch, W. W. Norton & Co (2013)

Non-fiction 
Hawkes: A Guide to his Fictions, Syracuse University Press (1973)
 A Dangerous Profession: A Book about the Writing Life, St. Martin’s Press (1998)
 Letters to a Fiction Writer, edited by Frederick Busch; W. W. Norton & Co (1999)

References

External links 
 Donald J. and Ellen Greiner collection of Frederick Busch at the University of South Carolina Irvin Department of Rare Books and Special Collections.
 Interview with Frederick Busch
 Featured author page in The New York Times
 "Frederick Busch, Author of Poetic Fiction, Dies at 64" (NY Times 02/25/2006)
 "Colgate professor, novelist Frederick Busch dies at age 64" (Colgate 02/26/2006)
 A Writer’s Writer: A Eulogy for Frederick Busch
 "Stealth Maneuvers: The Stories of Frederick Busch" by Katie Arnold-Ratliff (NY Times Book Review 12/29/2013)

1941 births
2006 deaths
Colgate University alumni
20th-century American novelists
Members of the American Academy of Arts and Letters
Writers from New York City
Jewish American novelists
21st-century American novelists
PEN/Malamud Award winners
American male novelists
American male short story writers
20th-century American short story writers
21st-century American short story writers
PEN/Faulkner Award for Fiction winners
20th-century American male writers
21st-century American male writers
Muhlenberg College alumni
Novelists from New York (state)
20th-century American Jews
21st-century American Jews